Altun is a Turkish surname meaning gold or golden. Notable people with the surname include:

Berfin Altun (born 1999), Turkish female weightlifter
Hakan Altun (born 1972), Turkish singer
Meryem Altun (1976—2002), Turkish prisoner, who died on hunger strike
Selçuk Altun (born 1950), Turkish writer
Yunus Altun )born 1977), Turkish footballer

See also
Altyn-Tagh (Altun Mountains)
Altun Ha, ruins of an ancient Mayan city in Belize

Turkish-language surnames